Abdulmajid Aliyu (born 1 June 1994) known professionally as Zayn Africa, is a Nigerian singer, songwriter and record producer.

Early life 
Zayn Africa was born in Kaduna State, Nigeria where he obtained his JSCE and SSCE from Command Secondary School Kaduna State, then moved further and obtained his degree education in Computer Engineering & graduated with a distinction from Bayero University Kano, Nigeria. 

In 2017, he released a musical studio album titled "The Relationship" with 11 tracks which earned him artistic recognition in Nigeria.

Discography 

 Music Album

In 2020, Zayn was featured in a Nigerian Hausa Hip-Hop musical song titled "Da so samu ne".

References

External links 

21st-century Nigerian male singers
Living people
1994 births
Nigerian male pop singers
Nigerian hip hop singers
Nigerian music industry executives
Nigerian child singers
Nigerian male singer-songwriters
Nigerian record producers